The Kutch Gurjar Kshatriyas (KGK) contributions to the Indian railways were widespread from the late 1850s to the latest reorganization of the Indian Railways infrastructure in 2003–2006. The community also widely known as Mistris of Kutch (or Mistry) migrated from Kutch to perform the work and were involved in the laying down of railway tracks and construction of rail bridges in almost all railway routes of undivided British India.

History

Railway construction
When in the 1850s the British started laying of railway lines in British India, the Mistris of Kutch decided to migrate out and try their skills in building bridges and railway tracks for the railways, leading to their widespread migration out of Kutch and their notable contributions in building of railways in British India.

It was during 1850 to 1930 AD that the KGK or Mistris of Kutch migrated outside Kutch and were involved in the construction of major rail-bridges and the laying down of railway tracks in almost all major rail routes of undivided British India doing the "Railway Thekedari" (Railway Contractors also Thikadari) and as Thekedar (or Thikadar) in Irrigation projects and Forest Department and Public Works Department.They have also done major roadway, road bridges, canal works, irrigation dams and barrage work throughout British India from 1850 to 1980. The communities' largest contribution is in the building of the early railway lines and bridges throughout British India. Their families migrated out of Kutch and settled in various parts of India during these early years of railway construction. Their works in railway construction span from 1850 to 1980 for more than one and a quarter of century.

1850–1880
Among the first members of the community to jump into Railway thekedari in the years 1850–1860 were Jivan Narayan Chauhan of Kumbharia and brothers Daya Pachan, Manji Pachan & Mepa Pachan Chawda of Sinugra laid the Railway lines in Scind Railways between Karachi – Kotri in years 1855–60 This section was of 106 miles. Jiwan Narayan's son Govamal Jivan Chuahan was born in Karachi in 1855, while he was laying rails for this line, who also became a major Contractor. The line was later extended from Kotri to Rawalpindi. Others to work with them in this section of Sind Railway in 1855–60 were Patel Ramji Ladhhani of Anjar and Narayan Raja of Madhapar. Looking at the expertise of Jeevan Narayan Chauhan, he was offered a job of Overseer in Sind Railways by British Officer, although he never attended school. He joined service of Scind Railway as overseer in 1862.

In the years 1852–1858, Ranchhod Pachan Rathod of Khambhra, was one of the pioneer who worked in laying of first railway tracks of British India between Bori Bunder and Thane for Great Indian Peninsula Railway. He later settled in Kalyan and was involved in erection of Sandhurst Road Overbridge and Railway cross bridge at Mazgaon . He also did works of Pune – Khandala Railway line in Great Indian Peninsula Railway. Later in 1858 he also did works of Khandala yards and station. Because of him many Mistris of Kutch from village Khambhra, Sinugra and others migrated to Bombay for Railway Contract jobs.

In 1869–71, brothers, Ladhha Bharmal Chawda & Ramji Bharmal Chawda of Chandiya were the Main Contractors for Great Indian Peninsula Railway; who built 153 miles long railway track from Itarsi to Jabalpur. The bridge over Tawa River near Bagra Tawa also built by them. The stations of Bagra-Tawa, Sohagpur, Pipariya, Gadarwara, Kareli  were also built by them.  There were other Contractors of the community from Kumbharia and Anjar working from Jabalpur side who built Madan Mahal, Bhedaghat, Sridham & Narsinghpur Stations. With completion of this line in 1871, the Great Indian Peninsula Railway got connected with East Indian Railway network with Jubbulpore as the Junction.

In 1875 Ratanshi Manji Tank of Sinugra did works of new Railway line of Patna and Gaya State Railway connecting Gaya with Patna run by East Indian Railway Company. The length of complete section was more than 55 miles running through Chakand, Tehta, Jehanabad, Nadauj, Taregna, Punpun to Patna. The bridge over Punpun River also built by him.

1880–1890

In Scinde, Punjab & Delhi Railways in 1881 to 1883 Govamal Jeevan Chuahan of Kumbharia and Mandan Jeevani of Madhapar completed in Punjab the Mari to Attock and Kushalgarh to Rawalpindi section in two years. Govamal Jeevan's son Manji Govamal was born in Rawalpindi in 1881 at time of this work, who also became a major Railway contractor when he grew up. The life-sketch of Govamal Jiwan Chauhan is noted by British in Encyclopaedia of Bengal, Bihar & Orissa in 1924–25.

In 1881 in Punjab Northern State Railway, Khora Ramji of Sinugra with his brothers Akhai Ramji, Pachhan Ramji, Teja Ramji, & Lira Velaji all of Sinugra built 100 miles of railways in Jhelum to Peshawar section, which opened to traffic in 1883. The fact is also mentioned in his life-sketch noted by British authorities in Encyclopaedia of Bengal, Bihar & Orissa in 1920.

For the knowledge of reader, it may be mentioned here in 1869, the Scinde Railway, Punjab Railway, Indus Flotilla & Delhi Railway were merged to form Scinde, Punjab & Delhi Railway. Further, in 1886 North Western State Railway was formed with merger of Scinde, Punjab & Delhi Railway, Punjab Northern State Railway, Indus Valley State Railway & eastern section of Sind–Sagar Railway & southern section of Sind–Pishin Railway and Kandahar State Railway. Major portions of this North Western Railway became Pakistan Railways upon the partition of British India in 1947 & the remaining section in India became the Eastern Punjab Railway. Similarly, a major portion of Bengal and Assam Railway went to East Pakistan and became Pakistan Eastern Railway ( now Bangladesh Railway) and remaining cut-off portion in Assam in India was called Assam Railway.

In the early decades of 1860–80 the major works for Bombay, Baroda and Central India Railway in Ahmedabad–Baroda–Surat section was done by brothers, Kunwarji Nanji Tank, Dahya Nanji Tank, Mavji Nanji Tank along with Kunwarji Anada Vadher all from Sinugra who worked from Ahmedabad and built railway track between Ahmedabad and Baroda including railway station and yard of Kalupur, Maninagar. Whereas  Sava Dahya, Devshi Dahya & Teja Dahya Taunk of Sinugra stationed themselves at Baroda and built Baroda Station & Yard and track towards Surat. Later Mavji Nanji Tank shifted to Phulera and did extensive works of Rajputana–Malwa State Railway in that section, while Kunwarji Anada Vadher shifted to Wadhwan for railway jobs in Wadhwan Morvi State Railway.

In Rajputana–Malwa Railway in 1880 Abu Road to Jawali MG section was completed by main contractor Anada Gova of Khedoi. In a tragic incident two agents – Hirji Kanji of Sinugra & Akhai Madha of Kumbharia – both died due to a mishap by falling into hot lime kiln. This section was of eighty miles of railway lines connecting Abu Road to Marwar city.

The Hubli Loco Yard & Workshop in Southern Mahratta Railway in 1880 was done by Khora Ramji Chawda of Sinugra. Further in Southern Mahratta Railway in 1882 Hubli to Gadag, 36 miles railway tracks were laid by Akhai Ramji, Pachhan Ramji, Teja  Ramji & Lira Vela all of Sinugra. Also in 1883–84 the Mistris of Kutch also worked in laying of railway lines between Hotgi to Bijapur, Bijapur to Bagalkot & Bagalkot to Badami to Gadag section of newly opened 177 miles of metre-gauge railway tracks of Southern Mahratta Railway. The main contractors for this section were Akhai Ramji, Pachhan Ramji, Teja Ramji Chawra & Jetha Lira & Lira Vela Jethwa all of Sinugra. Other contractors to work with them in this section were Dahya Pachan, Mepa Pachan, Dahya Dossa, Karsan Mulji, Kanji Mulji, Gangu Devji, Paba Gangu & Lala Devji all from Sinugra.

In years 1880–82, the Itarsi–Bhopal railway line constructed at the expense of Princely State of Bhopal and operated by Great Indian Peninsula Railway was constructed by Ladhha Bharmal Chawda & Ramji Bharmal Chawda of Chandiya. The total length of section  was 57 miles belonging to Bhopal State Railway and stations included were starting from Itarsi to Hoshangabad, Budni, Obaidulla Gunj, Mirsod terminating at Bhopal. The Gadroya bridge and other small bridges all built by them. A part of the line was officially opened to traffic in 1882 and was fully operational by next year. Ladhha Bharmal's son Ruda Ladha Chawra also became a major contractor and was awarded title Rai Sahib by British.

In Morvi Railway in 1883 Laddha Jeeva Rathod (Bhalsod) of Sinugra built bridge over Machhu River. Once trams used to ply over this bridge. Today it is used as Rail-Road bridge. In 1885 again Laddha Jeeva of Sinugra built bridge over Aaveli River near Paddhari for Morbi State Railway. The complete narrow-gauge section of Morbi to Wankaner of 18 miles was done by him, which was opened to traffic in 1890. This section was later converted to meter-gauge in 1924.

In Southern Mahratta Railway – contract for in Londa to Pune–Valti Ghat section was in 1884 done by Jeram Jagmal of Kumbharia – at Valti Ghat, Vishram Karman of Chandiya – build bridge over Neera River near Nira, Kanji Mavji of Sinugra & Raja Narayan of Kumbharia – both working near Belgaum and Valji Ratanji of Kumbharia near Miraj. Again in Southern Maratha Railway in 1886 Pune to Londa section Miraj – Sangli to Belgaum-Sangli section was completed by Vishram Karman of Chandiya, Manji Hira of Kumbharia, Jeram Jagmal of Kumbharia – he completed 36 miles section Ghamad-kata and Karman Mavji of Reha – who built bridge over Kannor River. The section was called Miraj–Sangli to Belgaum-Sangli because Princely State of Sangli also had an enclave near Belgaum. The section covered the stations of Vijaynagar, Ugar Khurd, Chinchli, Raybag, Chikodi Road, Bagewadi, Ghataprabha, Parkanhatti, Pachhapur, Sulebhavi and total length of this  line was 90 miles.

In Nizam's State Railways starting in 1884 Govamal Jivan Chauhan of Kumbharia built track between Wadi to Bezwada with fellow Mistris, Ruda Arjan Chawda of Kumbharia & Lalji Madan Chauhan of Madhapar including railway station of Bhuvanagiri, Timalgiri, Aler and Warangal. The total length of section was 332 miles and it took them four years to build the complete section of railway line starting from Wadi and running through Vikarabad, Hyderabad, Kazipet, Warangal terminating at Bezwada Junction. The line was completed in  1887 and opened to traffic in 1889.

The extension NG line of Morvi Railway for  25-½ miles from Wankaner to Rajkot in 1885–86 was completed by Laddha Jeeva with his brother Lalji Jeeva of Sinugra. The NG extension again of Morvi Railway in 1886–87 from Wankaner to Wadhwan of 50 miles was done by Devji Jeeva, Ladhha Jeeva Rathod & Kanji Manji Chawda all of  them from village Sinugra.

In years 1885–86, Varjang Mulji Tank of Khambhra built 43 miles railway line between Bhildi and Raniwara for Rajputana–Malwa State Railway. The track covered the stations of Marwar Ratanpur, Dugdol, Jari, Dhanera, Ramsan & Jenal. This line was further extended for another 27 miles from Bhildi to Palanpur tracks covering Lorwada, Disa & Chandisar.

In Tapti Valley Railway the most of the work was done by Khoda Ratna Tank of Sinugra between Surat and Amalner in 1886. The railway was owned by Killick Nixon Company. The Vyara section of 100 miles was built by Khoda Ratna Tank of Sinugra in 1896 and Nandurbar section of 57 miles was built by Jeram Jagmal Chauhan of Kumbharia. It was broad-gauge railway of 157 miles starting from Surat via Udhna, Bardoli,  Vyara, Nandurbar, Dondaicha, Virdel, Sindkheda up to Amalner. Thus the whole line of Tapti Valley Railway was completed by both of them. Later in year 1901, the Great Indian Peninsula Railway built an extension from Bhusawal and built Jalgaon – Amalner rail extension of further 34 miles across Parola, Dharangaon to join with its line with Tapi Valley Railway terminus at Amalner, thus in 1901 Surat–Bhusaval got complete rail link.

In South Indian Railway, the main contractors, Manji Daya Wegad with Lakhu Devji Vegad both of Anjar with Gangji Narayan of Khedoi & Varjang Harji from Nagalpar together built the metre-gauge railway lines and Pamban Bridge over creek of Rameshwaram from Mandapam to Pamban to Rameswaram construction of which they started in 1887 and completed in around 1912. The bridge was opened to traffic in 1914. It was in those years India's first and largest sea bridge. The bridge has a double-leaf bascule bridge section that can be raised to let ships pass under the bridge and is more than 2 km in length. The middle spans, the mid portion that opens up, were fabricated in England and assembled here in India. The rail-road bridge foundation was laid by deep-well sinking in sea beds with over 60 abutment and spans. It was the longest sea bridge in India having a length of 2.065 km  for almost 95 years till year 2009 when Bandra–Worli Sea Link having a length of about 2.3 km overtook it. This old Pamban Railway Bridge, one of the country's architectural marvels, is going to be pulled down now mainly for the reason of gauge conversion to broad-gauge and secondly because this bridge outlived its life of about 60 years.

In 1887 in Jhansi–Manikpore State Railway, Govamal Jiwan Chauhan of Kumbharia built whole line from Jhansi to Manikpore in three years. This line was of 183 miles running through of Orchha, Charkhari, Banda & Chitrakut. He also built branch line of 97 miles up to Jhansi from Bina including Railway Stations of Lalitpur, Jakhaura, etc. There were other Mistris working with him and also his brothers Harji Jiwan & Madhavji Jiwan Chauhan. The fact is also mentioned in his life-sketch given in Encyclopaedia of Bengal, Bihar & Orissa noted in 1924–25. It took him three years to complete whole section.

From Nagpur to Rajnandgaon, there was metre-gauge line called Nagpur Chhattisgarh Railway owned by Great India Peninsular Railways. The Bengal Nagpur Railway purchased it in 1887 and converted it into broad-gauge. And from 1888 onwards extended it from Rajnandgaon to Howrah. The pioneers in this section were Jagmal Gangji of Kumbharia, Valji Mehgji of Kumbharia, Raghu Pancha of Sinugra, Kanji Bhoja of Nagalpar, Jeeva Natha of Vidi, Devji Gopal of Kukma, Vasta Bhanu of Nagalpar, Nathu Petha of Hajapar together who built track from Rajnandgaon to Bilaspur including the bridge over river near Kumhari. Raipur railway station was built by Valji Meghji of Kumbharia, Ruda Raja of Khambhra, Khora Ramji of Sinugra, Kunwarji Ananda of Sinugra, Nathu Petha of Hajapar. Rajnandgaon Station was built by Raghu Panchha Tank of Sinugra, who was also honoured by Royal family of Rajnandgaon. Devji Gopal Parmar of Kukma, also did gauge conversion from meter gauge to broad gauge stationed at Dongargarh. Bilaspur railway station was built in 1890 by Jagmal Gangji of Kumbharia & Jeram Mandan of Kumbharia. Shivjee Aananda of Sinugra and Ranchhod Virjee of Vidi railway tracks between Bhatapara to Raipur. Khoda Ramji Chawda of Sinugra in 1888 built track from Bilaspur to Jharsuguda and bridge over river at Champa, Premji Govind of Devaliya built bridge over Ib River near Brajarajnagar, Karman Mavji of Reha built bridge over Bhurai River near Baradwar. Shyamji Gangji Savaria of Kumbharia built section from Champa to Raigarh including railway station of Raigarh. Tracks from Raigarh to Kharsia & Kharsia railway station were built by Vasta Gangji Savaria and Jeram Mandan of Kumbharia in 1890. Jeram Mandan of Kumbharia also built bridge over Mand River near Kharsia. The tracks from Jharsuguda onwards via Panposh to Chakradharpur were built by Premji Jeram & Shivejee Jeram of Khedoi, Jeram Gangji, Ramji Gangji, Jeram Mandan all of Kumbharia, Karman Vasta of Devaliya. The bridge over Brahmani River between Kalunga and Panposh was built by Jeram Mandan, Ramji Gangji with others.  Further in same year at other end from Kalimati to Sini up to Amda, the 37 miles of section was done by Gopal Ukeda of Kumbharia at Gamharia station, Keshvlal Dalpatram at Chakradharpur, Anada Gova of Khedoi – did last 10 miles up to Rajkharsawan. The total section of 293 miles from Bilaspur to Kalimati was mostly built by Mistris of Kutch.

In East Indian Railway in 1889 the Barun to Daltongunj section : Mistri Mulji Meghji of Nagor – built railway bridge over Rohava & Durgavati rivers, Garhwa siding of Bengal Coal Company, railway track works from Jalpa – Mavji Nanji of Hajapar] & Ghela Hira of Hajapar – did works near Shahava & Daltongunj, Mepa Madha of Reha – Garwa Road station. Bhimjee Kanji of Hajapar – working near Fulnava, Raja Khoda of Reha – near Karjari, Kanji Vishram of Khedoi – did 8 miles near Barun, Karsan Mavji of Kumbharia – did 10 miles from Barun, Pachan Naryayan of Khedoi & Shivjee Ananda of Sinugra – did 16 miles each of section – Nabinagar & Mohammadganj. The whole new railway line section of about 85 miles was done by them. The line was opened to traffic in 1902. This railway line was also known as Barun-Daltonganj Railway. The bridges in section were built over Bhalewa River and major bridge at Rehla over Koyal river in Garhwa branch line.

1890–1900
Further, the Bengal Nagpur Railway line from Sini to Purulia via Chandil in 1890 was also completed by fellow Mistris of Kutch namely, Main Contractors, Narayan Mandan of Kumbharia, Kheta Bhimjee of Reha including the bridge over Suvernreka River near Chandil. Together, they completed this very important section of 43 miles.

Again in 1890 in Bengal Nagpur Railway Kalimati to Kharagpur section works were done by Bhimjee Raghu of Vidi near Kalimati, Jagmal Ladhha of Sinugra – at Gidni, Nanji Kanji of Anjar – near Galudih, Manji Hira of Kumbharia – near Ghatshila, Jeevan Gangji of Kumbharia – near Narsinhgadh, Ramji Jetha of Kumbharia – bridge over Dhelang river, Raja Nondha of Kumbharia – near Jhargram, Dhanji Khawas & Dana Ayar both of Sanghad – working at Sardiha, Pachan Meghjee of Kumbharia – at Kalaikunda, Pitambar Sava & Mir Ismail Khan both of Rajkot – working from Kharagpur. In 1890 Premji Govind of Devaliya built two important  Bridges in this section; one over Kharkai River near Kalimati and  another over Subarnarekha River near Rakha Mines railway station. Together, they completed 85 miles of this section.

Further, the Bengal Nagpur Railway in 1890 started to build a line from Bilaspur to Katni. The contractors for this section were Jetha Narayan of Kumbharia, who built railway bridge over Man River, Narayan Mandan of Kumbharia, who worked between Bilaspur to Katni laid lines in Pendra Road section, Jagmal Gangji of Kumbharia between Kanta to Belsahna, Gora Nanji of Kumbharia at Bhesnala, Vishram Karman of Chandiya from Motinala to Ajninala, Nanji Dhanji of Galpadar, Manji Jeram Rathod of Madhapar between Bialspur to Katni, Bechar Hardas of Anjar built Ghutku station, Nanji Dossa of Sinugra built bridge over Rewa River from Katni side, Ramji Madha of Kumbharia stationed at Anuppur station, Ranchhod Virjee of Sinugra built Shahdol Station, Kanji Pachhan of Kukma near Belgad, Mepa Rajani of Kumbharia & Ruda Akahi of Kumbharia bridged Koil River. Thus, together the Mistri community completed whole Bilaspur -Umaria – Katni section. The track was first built from Bilaspur up to Birsinghpur with major stations of Pendra Road, Anuppur, Amlai, Shahdol, Khodargam and then extended to Umaria, where line from Katni was already existing. This section of Katni to Umaria of 37 miles was built in 1886 by some of the above Mistris of Kutch and was called Katni Umaria Provincial State Railway. The complete section from Bilaspur to Katni was of about 200 miles. The line was opened in 1891. The line in 1901 was connected with Murwara Junction of Great India Peninsula Railway about half a mile further up from Katni. Upon this extension, railway track from Bilaspur was connected to Etawa in United Province  and as such this line came to be known also by name of Bilaspur–Etawa Provincial State Railway.

In 1892 Kunwarji Ananda & Shivjee Anada Vadher of Sinugra with Karman Mavji of Reha built 30 miles railway branch line of Jharsuguda to Sambalpur in Bengal Nagpur Railway. Jharuguada Station before that was called Sambalpur Road. The railway bridge over Mahanadi River in this section was done by Karman Mavji of Reha.

Beginning from the year 1892 to 1898 the Kharagpur–Cuttack–Khurda Road section  of Bengal Nagpur Railway was also completed by Mistris of Kutch. Total number of Mistri contractors were more than sixteen, working from different locations like Dantan, Rupsa, Balasore, Bhadrak, Jajpur, Nergundi to Cuttack covering a distance of 257 miles of tracks & many bridges. There were some major rivers in this section, which were bridged by following Mistri Contractors–Premji Govind of Devaliya, Premji Jeram & Shivji Jeram of Khedoi and Devraj Dahya of Sinugra bridged Subarnarekha River after Dantan between Jaleshwar and Amrada.  Karman Raja & Devshi Raja of Khambhra bridged Balanga river near Balasore,  Ratna Lakhu of Madhapar with Jugal Sahib built bridge over Vaitarna river between Bhadrak and Jajpur, Jagmal Bhimjee & Karsan Bhimjee of Madhapar bridged Birupa river between Choudwar and Jagatpur.  Khora Ramji, Jetha Lira, Kanji Dahya & Devraj Dahya all from Sinugra bridged the branch of Brahmani river near Jokadia and Nanji Dossa Chawda of Sinugra & Bhagat Jeeva Vasta Padhiar of Anjar bridged the Brahmani River between Kendudhip and Jenapur. Triku Narayan Virani of Anjar, Premji Jeeva of Devaliya, & Jugal Sahib were the main contractor who bridged the mighty Mahanadi falling between Jagatpur and  Cuttack each building a section of the bridge. Jugal Sahib was a Maharashtrian railway contractor. Premji Devji & Manji Jeram both from Madhapar and Govind Dahya of Kukma bridged the Kathjori river on the rail tracks from Cuttack towards Gopalpur.  Manji Jeram's son Dahya Manji was born in the camp near Kathjori river.  Ratanshi Manji of Sinugra and Jeram Jagmal of Kumbharia bridged Kuakhai river near Cuttack.

In Bombay, Baroda & Central India Railway, Govamal Jeevan of Kumbharia in partnership with Mavji Gova of Anjar did 45 miles of the railway tracks between Dahod to Godhra in two years from 1892 to 1894. The track covered Usra, Limkheda, Piplod, Kansudhi.

In Khurda Road to Waltair section of East Coast State Railway in 1895 Mistris Govind Daya of Kukma built railway track after filling Sea near Chilka, Bridge over Ganjam River was erected by Khora Ramji of Sinugra and railway track by Nanji Dhanji of Galpadar and Manji Jeram of Madhapar, whereas Ratna Manji of Sinugra built bridge at Ganjam over Buckingham Canal with Premji Vala & Triku Vala of Kukma.

In 1896 Kharagpur to Howrah section of Bengal Nagpur Railway, the contractors were Govind Karsan of Hajapar, Keshawlal Dalpatram of Ahmedabad, Bechar Hardas of Anjar, Nanji Raghu of Anjar, Shamjee Pachan of Kumbharia. The bridge over Rupnarayan River at Kolaghat was also built by them, the contract for bridge was in name of Keshawlal Dalpatram of Ahmedabad. The bridge was completed after four years in 1900. Govind Karsan of Hajapar also had contract of lines between Howrah and Kharagpur and building stations of Balichak, Haur, Panskura. The section after the bridge covering stations Deulti, Bagnan, Kulgachia, Birshibpur, Uluberia, Chengail, Bauria Jn., Nalpur, Andul, Santragachhi, Ramrajatala, Tikiapara to Howrah was also completed by them in which section Manji Jeram of Madhapar & Kumbha and Nanji Mavji of Galpadar also worked. Tikiapara was at that time a junction on East Indian Railway Asansol line, where from this line of Bengal Nagpur Railway was connected to Howrah. The total very vital & important section from Kharagpur to Howrah of 72 miles was done by them. The section was opened to traffic in last month of year 1900. With completion of this section Bengal Nagpur Railway got connected from Nagpur up to Howrah. The total length of track was almost 703 miles, most of which was built by Railway Contractors of Kutch Gurjar Kshatriya community.

Upon completion of this line in 1900 the old Howrah station built in 1854 and owned by East Indian Railway, was now started to be used as terminus also by Bengal Nagpur Railway. Since then both BNR & EIR  now SER & ER respectively use Howrah Station as terminus. In 1900 the station had only 3 platform and old small structure used as office. Due to increase in traffic a new building and expansion of platform for Howrah station was proposed by East Indian Railway in 1901 and commissioned in 1905 with six platforms ready and was totally completed by 1911 by which time it was expanded to 13 platforms, with an arrangement that 11 were used by the owner company, East Indian Railway and 2 platforms allotted to Bengal Nagpur Railway. The station building was designed by British engineer, Halsey Ralph Ricardo, who chose Romanesque style of design for the new station, with brick-built arches and windows with lofty towers, which could be seen across the Hooghly river from Calcutta, the construction of which had started in 1901 was also completed in 1911. As per community records of Kutch Gurjar Kshatriyas, many Contractors from different villages of Mistri community of Kutch, also worked in construction of this new building and expansion of platforms, which exists as of today.

In 1897 in Bengal Nagpur Railway; Khurda Road to Puri section was completed by Mistris – Premji Jeeva of Devaliya – who built bridge of river at Aaragad, Triku Narayan of Anjar – who as Agent of Jugal Sahib built 10 feet – 30-span bridge, Premji Devji of Madhapar – built bridge over Ghelan River, Kumbha Mavji,  Nanji Mavji of Galpadar – built bridge over river between Gadmotri & Dhelang River, 10 foot 30-span bridge as Agent of Jugal Sahib, Jagmal Bhima & Karsam Bhima of Madhapar – also built bridge over river from Dhenlang to Puri – 10 foot 40 span as Agent of Jugal Sahib, Khimjee Walji Chauhan of Reha – built 10 foot 40-span bridge for river between Gadmotri & Dhelang. Thus the section was completed together by them.

Almost whole section of Kacheguda to Manmad Metre Gauge railway belonging to Nizam's Government  called Hyderabad–Godavari Valley Railways was completed by Mistris of Kutch. There were then twenty-five contractors from different villages of Kutch stationed at locations starting from Kacheguda, Medchal, Medak,  Nizamabad, Mudkhed, Nander, Parbhani, Jalna, Aurangabad, Vaijapur & Manmar. The railway construction started in 1897 simultaneously from different locations and was completed in 1900. The complete line was of  392 miles of tracks. Name of some are Nathu Lalji of Madhapar, Jeram Jagmal of Kumbharia, Ruda Arjan of Kumbharia, Lalji Mandan of Madhapar, Lira Kheema & Gova Kheema of Chandiya working in Nizamabad Section, Govind Jeevan & Arjan Dhana both of Lovaria working in Aurangabad section, Ghela Devji, Pancha Kana & Vala Gova all of Lovaria working in Parbhani section, Bhavanjee Madhavji & Pragji Madhavji of Devaliya working between Nander & Parbhani, Bhoja Natha of Kukma. Bhanji Dhanji of Devaliya from Vaijapur to Nagarsol terminating at Manmar. Rotegaon was last station of Nizam's Territories. Devram Ramji of Lovaria was honored and gifted a large piece of land by Nizam of Hyderabad for building railways in Aurangabad District for this railway called Hyderabad–Godavari Valley Railways. While Nathu Lalji Solanki of Madhapar, who later established himself in Secundrabad was given Shir-pav as an honor by Nizam of Hyderabad. This was a famed metre-gauge track, which was further connected from Manmad onwards by other railway companies like Great Indian Peninsula Railway, Holkar State Railway and Rajputana–Marwar Railway and Jaipur State Railway via Bhusaval–Khandwa–Mhow–Indore–Ratlam–Nimach–Chhitor–Ajmer to Jaipur on which later famous fastest metre-gauge train of India named Ajanta Express and another branch from Parbhani to Khandwa of Amraoti State Railway thru which Ajmer–Kacheguda Express (Meenakshi Express) ran also in post-independent India, till gauge conversion to broad-gauge decades of 1990 by Indian Railways.

In Bombay, Baroda & Central India Railway in 1889 the seven miles metre-gauge works of Muttra to Vrindavan was done by Khora Ramji & Jetha Lira both of Sinugra. During their stay they also built a Dharamsala now called Kutchi Kadia Dharamsala at Mathura.

1900–1914
In Gaekwar's Baroda State Railway in 1900 Ramji Dhanji of Kumbharia did complete section of 40 miles railway in Kosamba to Zankvav and extension up to Umarpada. The British Engineer who gave him this job was A. E. Thomas. As per details given in Book–Ramji Dhanji suffered a loss of one lakh in whole contract but still he completed the section in time. The British engineer A.E. Thomas, was so impressed with his sincerity that he later gave him contract for whole Agra to Bina section.

In Cutch State Railway, the first laying of narrow-gauge railways between Anjar and Tuna Port was done by the Mistris –  Vishram Karman Chawda of Chandiya with Devji Jutha Taunk of Devaliya & Narayan Premji Varu of Madhapar. Also in 1900–01 the railway lines between Anjar & Bhuj were laid by the Mistris – Karsan Bhara Parmar, Bhanji Kheemji Parmar & Bhanji Harji Parmar all of Kukma.  The Tuna–Anjar section of 12 miles became operational in 1905 and Anjar–Bhuj section of 26 miles in 1907–08.

In Great Indian Peninsular Railway in 1900 Govamal Jeevan Chauhan of Kumbharia built the 18 miles of railway lines from Damoh to Patharia in Katni to Sagar extension.

In 1900 the Kharagpur to Adra section of Bengal Nagpur Railway was done by Mistris–Jagmal Ladhha & Nanji Ladhha of Nagor – starting for Kharagpur, Ramji Jetha of Kumbharia – between Kharagpur & Midnapore, Raja Nondha of Kumbharia – near Midnapore, Thakkar Jetha Govind of Sanghad & Thakkar Govind Karsan of Hajapar–Agent: Manji Jeram of Madhapar – near Garai river, Thomson Sahib–Agent : Ratna Mepa of Devaliya, Premji Govind of Devaliya, Govind Karsan of Hajapar – did 3 miles of section including Godapyashal Station, Jeeva Bharmal of Chandiya & Ramji Jetha of Kumbharia – near Garbeta, Bhanu Nanji of Anjar – after Garbeta, Premji Govind of Devaliya – bridge over river & Garbeta Station, Nanji Nondha of Anjar & Shivjee Ananda of Khedoi – near Ramsagar, Ladhha Raja of Sinugra- near Bankura, Vasta Gangji & Jeevan Gangji of Kumbharia – near Savri, Jagmal Ladhha of Sinugra – near Bishnupur, Dhanjee Ruda Khavash – near Bankura, Vishram Devji of Kumbharia & Ramji Ruda of Khedoi near Chhatna. The bridge over Dhaleshwari River near Bankura was done by Jeevan Gangji of Kumbharia. Bankura railway station was built by Jeevan Gangji Savaria of Kumbharia and Lalji Raja Wadher of Sinugra. Together they completed whole section of 105 miles. Wife of Mistri Vasta Gangji of Kumbharia was killed by robbers, while he was working near Savri in this section.

Khoda Ratna of Sinugra did 40 miles of railway in Bombay, Baroda and Central India Railway with fellow Mistris Kala Sava, Jeeva Sava of Sinugra and Bhanu Raghu of Nagalpar, together they completed Sabarmati to Dholka section in 1900. This metre-gauge branch line was opened to traffic in 1902 and was also known by name of Ahmedabad–Dholka Railway. Later in 1922, this line was extended up to Dhandhuka for further 38 miles.

In 1901 Adra to Bhojudih section of Bengal Nagpur Railway was done by Mulji Jetha of Kukma – did 3 miles of section, Nondha Bhimjee of Madhapar – near Adra, Raghu Bhimjee of Khambhra – did 1 mile of section, Ramji Valji of Khedoi – built Chas Station, Nanji Kanji of Anjar & Premji Meghji of Kumbharia near Bhojudih and Manji Hira of Kumbharia & Thakkar Shamjee Madhavjee of Balambha – both of them together built bridge over river at Bhajudi. The total section of 18 miles was completed by them.

In East Indian Railway in 1902 Gaya to Katras via Kodarma section  of 125 miles was completed by Mistris – Mavji Manji of Hajapar – who built bridge over Adhar River, Ghela Hira  & Bhimjee Kanji both of Hajapar & Pancha Devji of Nagor.

In 1902 Khoda Ratna Tank of Sinugra and Ramji Dhanji Chawda of Kumbharia together did fifty miles railway tracks from Baroda to Godhra in Bombay, Baroda & Central India Railway. The tracks ran thru Samlaya, Champaner Road, Barkhol, Derol.

In Bengal Nagpur Railway in 1903 – Bhojudih to Talgadia – Mahuda section was completed by Manji Hira of Kumbharia – did three section of Damodar River Bridge, Ismail Khan – did one section of Damodar River bridge, Thakkar Shamji Madhavji of Balambha – did one section of bridge, Dhanji Devji of Madhapar – between Bhajudi to Mahuda, Premji Meghji of Kumbharia -near Bhajudi, Premji Govind of Kumbharia, Lagdheer Ramji of Sinugra & Bhimjee Ramji of Anjar – all near Adra, Ramdas Hindoostani & Kala Dana of Reha – near Talgadia. Together, they did whole section of 15 miles. The next section of Mahuda to Gomoh in 1903 was done by Ramji Gangji of Kumbharia – starting from Gomoh, Murji Govind of Madhapar – near Khanudi, Thomson Sahib, Agent: Ratna Mepa of Devaliya, Punja Petha of Hajapar, Shivjee Govind of Madhapar, Moti Murji of Anjar – all working between Mahuda & Gomoh and Gova Petha of Chandiya – who built Mahuda Station & section of 9 miles.

In Bengal Nagpur Railway in 1902 Gondia to Jabalpur NG line via Nainpur & Balaghat was built by Govind Daya of Kukma, Jagmal Bhimjee Rathod, Nongha Bhimjee Rathor & Govamal Jiwan Vegad all three of Madhapar & Harji Gangdas & Harilal Devanda both of Kumbharia including the bridge over Narmada River near Sakra Ghat & bridge at Jamtara. The complete section was of 143 miles. This narrow-gauge line was called Jubbulpore Gondia Extension Railway.

In years 1902 to 1906 Jagmal Daya of Kukma, Mulji Meghji of Nagor and Jeram Hardas Khodiyar of Anjar did the doubling of railway tracks between Khandwa to Itarsi in Great India Peninsular Railway. This section was of more than 114 miles.

In Great Indian Peninsular Railway in 1903 the magnificent bridge over Yamuna River near Agra was completed by Mulji Meghji of Nagor & Raja Narayan of Nagor. Bhoja Khima & Mavji Punja of Nagor were Head Agent working under them. Bhimjee Mavji of Hajapar & Bhanjee Govind of Kukma worked as sub-contractor for above bridge. Raja Narayan's son Jagmal Raja Chauhan later became famous Railway contactor.

The Agra City Station belonging to Great Indian Peninsular Railway in 1903 was built by Mavji Manji of Hajapar. Premji Kalyan of Kukma was Agent for Agra City Station.

The railway branch lines between of East Indian Railway from Shikohabad to Farukabad in same year 1903 were built by Mavji Petha, Dana Khoda, Bhimjee Kanji all of Hajapar, Mulji Meghji of Nagor, Bechar Premji of Madhapar & Jairam Govind of Kukma. The section between Shikoahabad and Mainpuri was opened in 1905 and whole section up to Farrukhabad was opened to traffic in 1906. The whole new section of about 66 miles was completed by all of them.

In 1903, the Railway bridge over River Ganges at Allahbad on railway track of East Indian Railway going to Lucknow was built by Khoda Ramji Chawda of Sinugra.

In 1904 complete narrow gauge railway line from Shahdara to Saharanpur of 93 miles of Shahdara Saharanpur Light Railway owned by Martin's Light Railways was single-handedly done by Jagmal Raja of Nagor with other Mistris working under him as Agents or sub-contractors. The stations in this route were Noli, Baghpat Road, Baraut, Shamli, Nanauta.

In 1904 Bhojudih to Bhaga to Mahuda section of Bengal Nagpur Railway was done by Keshawlal Dalpatram of Ahmedabad – built bridge over Damodar near Bhojudih, Khimjee Dossa of Nagalpar – near Sijua, Karman Vasta  & Bhimjee Dossa both of Devaliya – built Malkera Station. The total section from Bhojudih to Bhaga via Bhowrah of about 9 miles and from Bhaga to Mahuda – 13 miles. Total 22 miles of this section was done by above persons.

In Bengal Nagpur Railway – Nainpur to Chhindwara NG section in 1904 was done by main contractor Bhimjee Pancha of Nagor, who also built bridge over Prem River with other fellow Mistri Contractors of Kutch. The section was of 87 miles traverses through from Nainpur via Keolari, Palari, Keniwara, Bhoma, Seoni, Pipardahi, Samaswara, Kapurdha, Karaboh, Jhilmili, Markahandi to Chhindwara.

In 1904 in Rewari to Phulera section of Rajputana–Malwa Railway; Jeevan Devraj of Sinugra did 40 miles work & Ramji Dhanji of Kumbharia did 50 miles work. Together, they did 90 miles of work in this section. This line was taken over by BB&CI Rly. This metre-gauge line ran thru Kathuwas, Mirzapur Bachhaud, Narnaul, Kanwat, Ringus, Renwal, Khandel. Total length was 140 miles of which 90 miles track up to Ringus was done by other Mistris.

In Mayurbhanj State Railway in 1904–05, Walji Govind Chauhan of Nagor and other Mestri contractors did the works of narrow-gauge lines from Baripada to Rupsa of 32.5 miles track. 
 
The Nagda to Mathura section in Great Indian Peninsular Railway was completed in years 1905–08 by Mistris of Kutch. The complete details are as under. In 1905, Nagda to Mathura section 50 miles works was done by main contractor Ramji Raja of Kumbharia with sub-contractors Kunwarjee Ramji of Devaliya, Viram Khimjee, Ratna Karman, Dana Harbham all of Reha & Narayan Heera of Hajapar. In 1907, Nagda to Mathura D-2 section, 50 miles work done by main contractor, Hirjee Hardas of Anjar did 50 miles with sub-contractors, Odha Karsan of Reha, Govind Pancha of Kukma – near Piparia, Bhanjee Ladhha of Reha & Vishram Ladhha of Devaliya – near Shamgadh, Nanji Nodha of Khambhra, Mepa Dossa of Devaliya, Dhanjee Bhoja of Reha – built Pipariya Station. In 1907 – Nagda to Mathura D-3, D-4 contract of again 50 miles was done by main contractor Hardas Nanjee of Khambhra with Ratna Premji, Hirji Mavji, Jeram Premji, Khimjee Manji, Govind Pancha all of Kukma working for 50 miles in D-5 section in Sawai Madhopur and in D-6 section 50 miles in 1908 bridge over Nani Benas River was erected by Ratna Mulji of Nagor & Mavji Petha of Hajapar. Almost whole section of more than 350 miles was done by Mistris of Kutch.

In the same year 1908 Bina to Agra section of Great Indian Peninsula Railway was completed by main contractor Ramji Dhanji of Kumbharia. The contract for whole section was in name of Ramji Dhanji Chawra of Kumbharia, which he completed in partnership with fellow Mistris, his son Manji Ramji of Kumbharia – 96 miles, Hirji Mohanji of Tuna – 24 miles, Dahya Dhanjee of Kumbharia – 18 miles, Ramji Manji & Laxman Kanji both of Khedoi – 27 miles Fathehpur to Shikra, Karsan Arjan of Anjar – 24 miles, Kerwali Station, Kuwarjee Gokal of Anjar – 23 miles, Bhwanjee Laljee Thakkar of Bhachau – 18 miles. Ramji Dhanji together with fellow contractors completed 230 miles of the section. The British engineer who gave him this job was A. E. Thomas. Ramji Dhanji made huge profit in this section, which compensated, the loss suffered by him in GBSR Railway in Kosamba to Zankvav section 1900. He bid fare-well to Railway Contracts and purchased Hingir-Rampur Colliery in Orissa in 1909 and became Colliery owner.

The conversion of Rajkot–Wankaner–Wadhwan of Morvi Railway from narrow-gauge into metre-gauge in 1905 was also done by Laddha Jeeva, Lajlji Jeeva & Devji Jeeva Bhalsod with Kunwarjee Ananda, all from Sinugra. The section from Wadhwan to Wankaner via Surendranagar, Than Junction, Muli was of 50 miles & further 25.50 miles up to Rajkot via Khorana, Kanakot, Sindhawadar

In 1905 Kannur to Mangalore section of Southern Maratha Railway was completed by Valji Bhimjee of Madhapar, Jivram Punja of Hajapar, Jeevram Manji of Hajapar, Kunwarjee Ruda of Nagor, Ratna Premji of Kukma & Valji Govind of Nagor. The total section was of around 83 miles via Cheruvathur, Kanhangad, Pallikkara, Kottikulam, Kasargod, Kumbla, Uppala, Majeshwar & Ullal. The line covered whole coastal area of Malabar province of Madras Presidency.

In Great Indian Peninsula Railway in 1906 Daund to Baramati section was done by Mavji Manji of Hajapar with fellow Mistris. The total length of the section was about 23 miles with only one station named Kathphal between Daund and Baramti. The railway was called Daund Baramati Railway and run by G.I.P. Railway.

In Bengal Nagpur Railway in 1906 narrow-gauge railway line from Ranchi to Purulia, whose D.E. was Mr. Dagon, was laid by Mistris Premji Govind of Devaliya – who almost built the whole line, with Hirji Karamshi of Devaliya, Viram Khimjee of Devaliya- working near Purulia, Gopal Karsan of Madhapar- working near Jhalda, Sutar Lavji of Balambha- whose Agent was Hira Jeram of Madhapar. The track ran thru Namkon, Tatisilwai, Muri, Tulin, Jhalda, Kotshila, Garh-Jaipur, Chas Road & Gourinathdham. This line was also known as Purulia Ranchi Light Railway.

The Gondia to Nagbhid section of Bengal Nagpur Railway in 1906 was completed by Murji Akhai of Nagalpar – between Gongli to Nagbhid, Khimjee Valji of Reha – Gongli Station, Manji Hira of Kumbharia – 7 miles section near Wadegaon, Mepa Ramji of Devaliya – near Arjuni, Kala Dana of Reha – near Bonedgaon, Thomson Sahib, Agent: Ratna Mepa of Devaliya – bridge of Shohad River, Gayashankar Bhavanjee of Kathiawar & Shamjee Madhavjee of Balambha – bridge over Wainganga River, Parbat Devshi of Kumbharia – near Wadsa station, Jagmal Bhima of Madhapar – 7 miles section near Brahmpuri, Murji Govind of Madhapar – Kirmiti station, Vishram Anada of Reha – Nagbhid station. Together, they completed whole section of 81 miles. The Nagbhid to Itwari section of Bengal Nagpur Railway in 1906 was completed by Karsan Bhima of Madhapar – built bridge over Bhivapur River, Ramji Pachhan of Kumbharia – Kuril station, Kanji Murji of Sinugra – near Umred, Kunwarjee Narayan of Devaliya – bridge over Bamni River, Ramji Jetha of Kumbharia – from Shibi Village. Together, they completed the whole section.

In Bengal Nagpur Railway in 1906 Nagbhid to Chanda, section was completed by Murji Govind of Madhapar, Bhanjee Ananda of Reha, Lalji Veera of Khambhra, Ranchhod Hardas of Anjar, Vishram Ananda of Reha – who built bridge over Mul River near Mul, Manji Hira of Kumbharia, Varjang Mulji of Khambhra & Ghela Premji & Premji Devji of Kukma – who built bridge over river near Alewahi. Together, they completed the Nagbhid–Chandrapur section. This complete Railway from Gondia to Chanda run by Bengal Nagpur Railway was thus completed by Mistris of Kutch. This railway was also known as Gondia Chanda Railway.

The Nagpur – Kamthi to Ramtek section complete section of Bengal Nagpur Railway in 1906 was  done by brothers Jeram Hardas & Bechar Hardas Khodiyar of Anjar. This section was of 26 miles.

In 1908 in Southern Maratha Railway – Hospet to Kotturu section completed by Jeram Jagmal of Kumbharia, Devshi Ladhha of Sinugra & Premji Karsan of Sinugra. This railway run by SMR was also known as Hospet–Kottur Railway. The length of this section was about 44 miles. It was a metre-gauge branch line in Londa to Guntakal section of SMR.

In Bengal Nagpur Railway – construction for Nagpur to Chhindwara NG section was started in 1908 was also completed by the Mistris of Kutch. The first division from Nagpur–Itwari to Sausar was completed by Govind Dahya of Kukma, Bhimjee Raghu & Virjee Ramji both of Hajapar, Naran Mulji of Hajapar & Jadavjee Bhanjee of Madhapar both near Patan-sami, Mavji Jeeva of Reha, Shivjee Raja of Jambudi, Madan Narayan of Madhapar, Kunwarjee Narayan of Devaliya & Bhanjee Harji of Nagalpar – both near Fulodkui, Bhimjee Pancha of Nagor – bridged river at Lodhikheda, Gopal Pachan of Kukma -near Bidi village, Kala Murji of Madhapar near Sausar. Together, they completed the first section from Nagpur to Sausar of 50 miles. The second section from Sausar to Chhindwara in Nagpur–Chhindwara line construction also started in 1908 was done by Mistris Bhimjee Pancha of Nagor – bridged Raykona River, Khimjee Nanji of Khambhra – near Patiar village, Gopal Ratna of Reha – from Patiaar, Ananda Narayan of Kumbharia & Ratna Mepa of Devaliya – both near Kukadi Khapa, Bhoja Ramji of Nagor – near Umar Nala, Gopal Pachan of Kukma – near Taku Village, Raja Ramji of Nagor – towards Chhindwara. Together, they completed second section of about 45 miles from Sausar to Chhindwara in Nagpur–Chhindwara line. The line was opened to traffic in 1913. This railway was also known as Nagpur Chhindwara Railway. This narrow-gauge line traverses through picturesque landscape and water-falls of Kukdi Khapa and Lilahi of Kanhan River between Umar Nala & Ramakona station.

In Great Indian Peninsular Railway in 1908 at Allahbad, the railway bridge over River Ganges was built by Jagmal Raja Chauhan of Nagor. This bridge of 6000 ft or say over one mile in length was erected by well-sinking method. The abutment, girders, arching all works requiring engineering knowledge were done by Jagmal Raja. It had 40 spans at 150 ft length. The Head Agent of bridge was Ladhha Ratna of Nagor, Brick in-charge was Punja Ramji of Madhapar, Brick-field in-charge was Kheta Ramji of Madhapar & lime-kiln in-charge was Nondha Ananda of Nagor. The certificate of this bridge work later helped Jagmal Raja get work of Bally Bridge.

In Bengal Nagpur Railway in 1908 Balaghat to Katangi section including bridge over Ven-Ganga was completed by Jagmal Gangji of Madhapar, Mulji Govind of Madhapar – near Wara Seoni Station, Manji Jeram Rathod of Madhapar, Manji Heera of Kumbharia – was main agent working between Balaghat & Katangi with Khimjee Valji of Reha, Vishram Ananda of Reha & Premji Jetha of Kukma and Mayashankar Bhavanjee of Kathiawar. The complete section was of about 27 miles.

In 1908 Moti Mulji of Anjar, Lalji Veera of Khambhra, Bhimjee Dossa & Valji Premji both of Devaliya completed 4 miles railway track of Betul to Badnur Section of Great Indian Peninsula Railway of which Railway bridge over Kanhan River was erected by Valji Premji of Devaliya.

Nathu Lalji Solanki of Madhapar built 90 miles railway track in Nizam's Guaranteed State Railway and Trikamji Punja Rathod of Khambhra built 10 miles railway track between Secunderabad to Kazipet to Warangal in 1910 for same railway.

In Bengal Nagpur Railway in 1910 Tatanagar to Gorumahsini section was completed by Kanji Daya of Sinugra & Valjee Jheena of Rajkot working from Tatanagar, Khengar Narayan, Premji Khengar of Kukma stationed near Haludpukur, Raja Nondha of Kumbharia at Nelam Ghat, Virjee Nonda of Kumbharia, Ramji Jetha of Kumbharia, Nonda Devshi of Madhapar, Nanji Lira of Kukma, Shivjee Bhanjee of Nagalpar all working between Tatanagar–Gurumahisani, Ruda Laddha Raja of Sinugra near Chachad-ghat, Ranchhod Virjee Chawda of Sinugra stationed near Tikhia Village for Chachad-ghat hill cutting, Kunwarji Vasta of Anjar after Chachad-ghat, Karsan Bhimjee of Madhapar & Ramji Mavji of Madhapar near Gurumahisani, Khengar Bhimjee, Pancha Ratna, Hardas Khimjee, Ramji Khimjee all of Khambhra built track after Haludpukur. Together they built the whole 40 mile branch line opened in 1911.

In Bengal Nagpur Railway in 1910 Tatanagar railway station was built by Nanji Govindji Tank & his son Ranchhod Nanji Tank of Hajapar. There was small platform station called Kalimati, which was renamed Tatanagar by Railways, after J. N. Tata, who laid foundation of Tata Steel Company near Sakchi. The railway line extensions for Tata Steel Company from Kalimati to Sakchi were also laid by Nanji Govindji of Hajapar. Nanji Govindji & Sons were also one of the first contractors to be registered with Tata Steel Co. and have built many portion of Tata Steel factory at Jamshedpur. They held status of First Class Contractors till they stopped contractor's works. They had large brick klin and office in present-day Bistupur Area of Jamshedpur.

The Idar to Brahmkhed section Bombay, Baroda & Central India Railway in 1912 was done by Jeram Premji of Kukma – 10 miles, and Nanji Nondha of Khambhra – near Kadiyara 5 miles with fellow contractors Prabhashankar & Amba Leela of Halvad – near Vadali 5 miles. The total section of 20 miles was done by them.

In 1910 Kota to Baran section covering the tracks via Bijora, Antah, Bhonra, Digod of Great Indian Peninsula Railway was done by Jeram Premji & Ratna Premji both of Kukma. The total track was of about 45 miles.

In Great Indian Peninsular Railway in 1910, doubling of railway tracks between Bhusaval to Nagpur was done by Mistri Vishram Govind of Kukma – did 10 miles, Ajni railway station was built by Narayan Jeram Jethwa of Nagalpar Mandan Narayan of Madhapar- 10 miles & Sindi Station, Nanji Bhanji with Mandan Bhanjee both of Kukma- 10 miles & Paunar Station, Sorathia Teja – 5 miles & a bridge, Ruda Daya of Kukma – 12 miles near Pulgaon, Shivjee Ruda Daya of Kukma – 10 miles near Khapri, Jagmal Daya of Kukma – 35 miles near Murtijapur, again Mandan Narayan of Madhapar – 5 miles near Katepurna, Narayan Kheema of Reha – 10 miles near Nagjihari station, Madhavjee Thakkar of Reha – after Nagjihari and Shamjee Kheta of Anjar up to Bhusaval. Shamjee Kheta of Anjar also later did extension of Nagpur railway yard.

In Gaekwar's Baroda State Railway, Hemraj Kanji Chawda of Sinugra in 1912 did the Bilimora to Sara NG Section via Gandevi, Bansda Road, Kevdi Road up to Waghai was completed by them. The total length of section was 40 miles.

In 1912 in Southern Maratha Railway – Dhone to Kurnool section via Dupadu, Veldruti, was completed by again Jeram Jagmal of Kumbharia, Jagmal Ladhha of Sinugra, Premji Karsan of Sinugra & Raja Padma of Sinugra. The total length of section was 33 miles.

In Bengal Nagpur Railways in 1913 Adra to Bankura doubling of 32 miles was done by Lalji Raja Wadher of Sinugra, Jeevan Gangji Sawari of Kumbharia, Devji Meghji of Kumbharia and Dana Premji Maru of Devaliya.

In South Indian Railway, further, after the completion of Pamban Bridge by Mistris of Kutch, the first lines were laid up to Pamban Junction. From here the railway lines bifurcated into two directions: one towards Rameshwaram, about 6.25 miles up; and another branch line of 15 miles terminating at Dhanushkodi. Both these lines were also laid by the Mistris of Kutch: Manji Daya Wegad with Lakhu Devji Vegad, both of Anjar; Gangji Narayan of Khedoi; and Varjang Harji from Nagalpar between 1910 and 1914. The famed boat mail of last century ran on this track between 1915 and 1964 from Madras Egmore up to Dhanushkodi, from where the passengers were ferried to Talaimannar in Ceylon.  The metre-gauge branch line from Pamban Junction to Dhanushkodi was abandoned after it was destroyed in a cyclone in 1964.

1914–1940
In Bombay, Baroda & Central India Railway in 1914 Bharuch to Jambusar section was done by Hardas Nanji of Khambhra – 5 miles, Hemraj Kanji Rathod of Khedoi – 4 miles near Samni Station, Kala Sava of Sinugra – 4 miles after Samni, Jutha Nonda of Khambhra – 7 miles starting from Jambusar. This section was of 28 miles. Later further 16 miles of extension from Jambusar to Kavi was also completed by them.

In Bhavnagar State Railway in 1914, Botad to Jasdan section via Paliyad Road, Vinchhiya including the bridge over Utavali River was done by Lalji Jeeva & Laddha Jeeva, both of Sinugra and Kanji Mavji of Kumbharia and Ramji Valji of Khedoi. The total length of section was 33 ½ miles.

In East Indian Railway in 1914 Mughalsarai yard extension on both sides was done by Jagamal Raja of Nagor. The Agents working with him were Premji Kalyan of Kukma and Shivjee Devraj of Madhapar. Even today, the Mughalsarai Yard is the largest railway yard of Indian Railways and the second largest in Asia.

In East Indian Railway in 1915, Gaya to Katras doubling of 56 miles was done by Jagmal Raja of Nagor as main contractor and Bhimjee Raja of Nagor and Ratna Govind of Madhapar working as sub-contractor. Next year in 1916, Gaya Yards extension was also done by Jagmal Raja of Nagor with Laddha Punja of Nagor working as his Head Agent.

In Nizam's State Railway in 1915 Secunderabad to Mehboobnagar section was done by Moti Murji of Anjar, Jeram Jagmal of Kumbharia – including Balanagar Station, Devji Jutha of Devaliya – Mehboobnagar station also built by them. The section was of about 70 miles.

From Bankura to Rainagar complete narrow-gauge line of Bankura Damodar Railway owned by McLeod's Light Railways in 1915 was done by Premji Jeram and Ladhu Mandan both of Khedoi. The complete section of 60 miles was done by them with other Mistris like Govind Jeevan & Narbheram Jeevan of Kumbharia working as sub-contractors. The tracks starting from Bankura ran through Nobanda, Beliator, Sonamukhi, Patrasaf, Kumrul, Indas, Sehara Bazar, Gopinathpur to Rainagar.

In Great Southern of India Railway in 1915, Quilon to Trivandrum – 40 miles section the contractors were Manji Dahya of Anjar and Jeram Nanji of Sinugra.

During years 1915 to 1919 in four years Ratanshi Manji Tank of Sinugra did contract for 66 miles of railway lines in East Indian Railways connecting Jainagar, Sakri, Darbhanga with Samastipur. The bridge over River Falgoo at Gaya in 1919 was also built by him.

In 1918, the Anuppur to Barwadih section of Bombay, Baroda & Central India Railway was built by together by Mistris, Hardas Khimjee of Khambhra – working near Phulwara, Narayan Vala of Kukma & Parbat Mavji of Khambhra – did 6 miles, Jeram Premji of Kukma & Triku Jutha of Khambhra- did 5 miles, Ratna Premji of Kukma with Gopal Ukeda of Kumbharia – built bridge over Kevai River, Khimjee Manji of Kukma & Laxman Hirjee of Khedoi – did 4 miles,  Vasta Manji of Kukma & Akhai Parbat of Khedoi – near Bijuri & Ramji Gangji of Kumbharia built bridge over Hasdeo River near Chirmiri & few miles in this section. The other Mistirs who worked in this section were Shamjee Nanji & Dhanjee Shamji Chawda of Sinugra, Pancha Premji & Pragji Jairam of Sinugra, Raghu Ramji Chawda of Sinugra, Ramji Vasta Chuahan of Sinugra, Mulji Jagmal Sawaria & Ranchhod Jagmal Savaria of Kumbharia, Ranchhod Virjee Chawda of Sinugra &  others. The railway station built were Kotma, Manendragarh, Boridand, Bahiatola, Mauhari, Bijuri & Harrad. The 54 miles of new line was including all railway station were built by Mistris of Kutch. The line was opened to traffic partly from 1928 and became fully functional in 1931. The line was built specially for transportation of coal from this rich coal mining area.

The doubling of whole section of 28 miles from Gomoh to Hazaribagh in East Indian Railway via Parasnath was done by Lira Raja Bhalsod of Khambhra with fellow Mistris in 1919. Order dated 18-10-1919, Lira Raja Rathod, Gomoh–Hazaribag doubling E.I.R., By James Beer, E.E., Dhanbad.

In 1920 Cuttack to Talcher complete section via Nergundi, Kendrapara, Dhenkanal of Bengal Nagpur Railway was done by Raghu Karsan of Madhapar, Jeram Gangji of Kukma & Ramji Hardas of Khambhra. The section was of 75 miles.

In Bengal Nagpur Railway in 1920 Amda to Jamda railway line built for transportation of iron ore the contractors were Bhanjee Ladhharam of Reha stationed at Gua, Murji Govind of Madhapar at Jamda, Shamji Mepa of Sinugra & Manji Heera of Kumbharia stationed near Noamundi, Jeevan Gangji & Ramji Jetha both of Kumbharia stationed near Danguwapasi, Manji Jeram, Ratna Govind & Nanji Devshi all of Madhapar stationed near Jhinkpani, Varjang Harji, Khimjee Dossa both of Nagalpar & Kunwarji Vasta of Anjar all near Hatgamharia, Vishram Arjan & Bhanjee Ananda of Reha at Chaibasa, Daya Ramji of Balambha & Premji Khengar of Kukma together completed whole section. Of which Chaibasa station was built by Bhanji Anada of Reha, Danguwapasi station built by Premji Khengar of Kukma. The total section of 74 miles was completed by them.

In Bhavnagar State Railway in 1921 Botad to Kharaghoda section, lines from Botad to Dhola junction via Latidad, Ningala, Alampur, Ujalvav was done by Laxman Kanji of Khedoi & Gangji Narayan also of Khedoi. This track covered a distance of 28 miles.

In 1921 Rourkela to Biramitrapur via Panposh railway line of Bengal Nagpur Railway of 17 miles of length built for Tata Company's limestone quarry was done by Kunwarjee Narayan of Devaliya. In 1923 Biramitrapur to Hathibari section was done by Varjang Mavji, Varjang Vishram both of Kumbharia, Jeram Nanji of Sinugra and Shivjee Jeram of Khedoi.

In 1921 in Bengal Nagpur Railway, Sini to Purulia doubling was done by Ratna Mepa of Devaliya – starting from near Kandra station to Chandil, Kunwarjee Narayan – doubling of tracks over bridge on Suvarnareka River near Chandil, Mulji Jagmal of Kumbharia – Nimdih to Biramdih, Lalji Mandan of Khedoi, Jetha Govind of Sanghad & Gopal Ukeda of Kumbharia – all three working between Biramdih to Barabhum – Balarampur, Raanchhod Virji of Sinugra -Balarampur – Barabhum to Urma, Arjan Ladhha of Kumbharia – Urma to Kantadih, Vishram Meghjee of Kumbharia – Kantadih to Tamna, Manji Jeram of Madhapar – Tamna to Purulia, Gova Karamshi of Devaliya – Purulia to Bagalia, Shamjee Bechar of Anjar – near Chhara, Kunwarjee Ramjee of Devaliya – near Anara to Adra. Together, they completed doubling of whole section from Sini to Adra via Purulia of about 76 miles.

In Rajasthan State Railway in 1921; Jaipur to Jhunjhunu Section was done by Premji Ramji of Nagalpar working near Amrol, Narayan Veera of Sinugra from Jaipur, and Lalji Devji of Jambudi at Jhunjhunu. This section was of 108 miles. Further, Jaipur to Bandikui  section of 55 miles was also done by them. The other contractor in Bandikui section were Chonda Ruda & Devshi Chonda of Sinugra.

In Nizam's State Railway the Kazipet to Balharshah section in 1921 was done by Mistris main contractor–Trikamji Punja of Khambhra with Karsan Khengar, Hardas Khimjee all of Khambhra, Khengar Ratna of Hajapar, Main Contractor Jeram Jagmal of Kumbharia with other sub-contractors working at different locations – a few details as follows are : Jeram Ramji, Ratanji Kanji all of Kumbharia, Dahya Devji of Devaliya – including Potkapalli & Peddapalli Station, Bhoja Natha of Kukma, Jetha Kalyanji of Anjar – working between Kagaznagar, Mandamarri & Mancherial, Moti Murji of Anjar – at Makudi, Premji Meghji of Kumbharia – after Makudi towards Sirpur, Nanji Lira of Kukma – near Wirur station, Nathu Lalji of Madhapar – 11 miles after Wirur Station, Raja Vasta of Nagalpar – near Manikgarh station. Together, they completed whole section. The total section was of than 145 miles.

In 1922 the Dholka to Dhandhuka extension of metre-gauge lines run by Bombay, Baroda & Central India Railway was done by Hemraj Kanji Chawda, Govind Ladhha of Sinugra,  Laxman Kanji & Ramji Narayan of Khedoi and Kanji Mavji of Kumbharia. The total length of section was about 38 miles. This line was also called Dholka-Dhandhuka Railway.

In East Indian Railway in 1922 Dhanbad Yards extension was done by Jagmal Raja of Nagor with Patel Kunwarjee Ramji & his son Bhawan Kunwarjee of Devaliya working as his sub-contractors.

In 1922 the railway track from Chandil to Barkakana of Bengal Nagpur Railway was built together by Khengar Petha of Chandiya, Nanji Mavji of Galpadar, Ranchhod Mavji & Khimjee Nanji both of Khambhra, Premji Ananda & Kunwarji Narayan both of Devaliya & Devshi Nathu of Anjar. The complete section was of about 78 miles.

In Great Indian Peninsular Railway in 1922 new line section of Nagpur to Itarsi was opened. In Nagpur to Pandhurna section the works were done by Jagmal Gangji of Madhapar – near Padhurna, Ranchhod Hardas of Anjar – near Karwar, Ranchhod Hirjee of Anjar – after Karwar, Ratna Govind Anjar – near Machakia, Arjan Ladhha of Kumbharia & Murlji Govind of Madhapar – after Machakia, Thakkar Shamjee Madhavjee of Balambha & Raghu Nondha of Kumbharia – near Narkhed, Harbham Khengar of Kukma & Devji Jutha of Kumbharia – after Narkhed, Kalji Raja of Sinugra- near Amla, Kala Dana of Reha – near Katol. Nagpur to Katol section was also done by most of the Mistris mentioned above. Pandhurna to Itarsi section the contracts were in hands of Ruda Ladhha Chawra of Madhapar – working from Itarsi, Vishram Walji Rathod of Madhapar – working from Betul, which they completed with help of other fellow Mistris.

In 1922 Barkakana to Daltonganj section of Great India Peninsular Railway was done by following Mistris of Kutch. Morar Lalji of Khedoi – started from Barkakana, Waghjee Jeevan of Khedoi & Valji Jada of Kukma – towards Daltongunj, Mulji Madhavjee of Anjar, Hirjee Kalyanji of Anjar – did Khelari section cutting & dynamite blasting works, Govind Ladhha & Ranchhod Pancha of Nagalpar – did grounding works from Khelari, Ramji Valji of Khedoi – built bridge over river near Richughutu, Ranchhod Dahya & Varjang Jeeva both of Khambhra– started line construction of section after Ruchukota Bridge, Jeram Nanji of Sinugra & Khengar Nanji of Khambhra – did sections near Churuguda, Nanji Mavji & Kumbha Mavji of Galpadar – did the whole section of Chandwa – Bharla, Ranchhod Virjee of Sinugra, Kunwarjee Lalji Raja of Sinugra, Bhimjee Mepa of Sinugra & Viram Khimjee of Devaliya together did section near Latehar, Ladhu Mandan & Hardas Karsan both of Khedoi did works near Barwadih, Premji Virjee of Sinugra near Kumendi. Together, they completed whole section of 115 miles Barkakana to Daltonganj.

In very next year 1923 Barkakana to Bermo line again of Great Indian Peninsular Railway was built together by Mistris Ratna Mulji, Bhimjee Pancha, Vishram Raja, Raghu Govind, Raja Ramji, Bhoja Ramji all of Nagor, Nanji Jetha of Madhapar, Varjang Kanji of Anjar, Ramji Valji, Hardas Karsan both of Khedoi, Jetha Gopal of Kukma, Jeeva Natha of Vidi, Varjang Vishram of Kumbharia, Lalji Raja, Kalji Raja, Ranchhod Virjee, Premji Virjee, Dhanji Virjee all of Sinugra, Bhanjee Mulji of Hajapar & Valji Premji, Meghaji Devji both of Devaliya. The section was about 42 miles covering stations Arigada, Jogeshwar, Dumri, Gumia, Bokaro and Jarangdih.

In Bhavnagar State Railway in 1923 Mahuva to Kundla section via Dungar, Rajula, Vijpadi & Gadhakda was done by Hemraj Kanji Rathod of Khedoi. The total section was of about 43 miles of railway tracks.

In Bhavnagar State Railway in 1924 Botad to Dhandhuka section was done by Ramji Narayan of Khedoi, Laxman Kanji of Khedoi & Govind Laddha of Sinugra, including Sarangpur Road Station and Ganji Naryan of Khedoi, who also built bridge over Bhimnath River. The complete length of section was 25-½ miles via Sarangpur Road, Bhimnath & Tagdi.

In 1924 at Calcutta the Khiddirpur King George Dock-yard extension of Calcutta Port Trust was done by Jagmal Raja of Nagor with Bhimjee Pancha & Mavji Punja both of Nagor working as his Agent.  This work of over Rs. one crore. was completed in 1927. The railway line of Calcutta Port Commissioners' Railway connecting this yard to East Indian Railway were also laid by them. King George Dock has now been renamed as Netaji Subhas Docks (NSD).

In Southern Maratha Railway in 1925 – Hotgi to Solapur 12 miles section was completed by Jeram Jagmal of Kumbharia with Vishram Bhimjee of Khedoi & Morarjee Mandan of Khedoi.

Further, in East Indian Railway in 1925 the bridge of double line over River Son at Dehri-on-Sone griding and arching work was done by Jagmal Raja of Nagor with his brother Madhavjee Raja of Nagor. In 1927 both of them also did dismantling of old girders & re-erecting new girders and arching work of bridge over River Son at Arrah. In same year 1927, both Jagmal Raja and Madhavjee Raja of Nagor also dis-mantling of old girders and re-erecting new girders & arching work of bridge over River Yamuna at Allahbad. They had done the girding and arching work of same Yamuna-Allahbad Bridge in 1911, which they dismantled in 1927 & re-did the new job.

In Bengal Nagpur Railway in 1926, Raipur to Vizianagaram section was completed by starting from Parvatipuram – the following Mistris together completed the whole section. Vishram Bhanjee of Kumbharia, Khengar Nanji of Khambhra, Lalji Nanji Parmar of Meghpar, Kanji Mavji & Varjang Vishram both of Kumbharia near Domradar, Lakhu Varjang of Anjar, Laghu Valji of Khambhra, Ratna Govind of Anjar, Valamji Jeram of Khedoi, Lira Raja Bhhalsod of Khambhra – major work near Rayagada, Lira Kachra of Devaliya, Dhanje Khengar and Lira Raja both of Khambhra – section near Nagveli, Kheta Nanji of Madhapar near Dhepaguda, Jeeva Natha of Vidi – near Tekarpara, Jeram Nanji of Sinugra, Varjang Vishram of Kumbharia, Bhanjee Dana of Nagor, Arjan Parbat & Arjan Shivjee both of Khedoi, Ruda Valji of Kumbharia – from Raipur to Arang- the bridge over Mahanadi, Parbat Mavji of Khambhra, Bechar Hardas of Anjar, Varjang Hirjee of Nagalpar, Raja Ramji of Nagor, Mulji Jetha Bhojani of Kukma – built bridge over river near Sitanagar, Premji Khengar & Jagmal Bhana both of Kukma. The section was opened in 1931. The total section from Raipur to Vijiyanagaram covering a distance of about more than 290 miles of railway tracks and many bridges with major stations Mahasamund, Bagbahara, Khariar Road, Kantabanji, Titlagarh, Kesinga, Muniguda, Rayagada, Parvathipuram and Bobbili was thus also built by Mistris of Kutch.

In 1928 Paralakhemundi to Gunupur section of Bengal Nagpur Railway was completed by Vishram Bhara of Kukma started from Parlakmedi, Pancha Karsan of Madhapar – near Varnashi, Karsan Ramji of Madhapar near Kanua Village, Khima Rava of Hajapar near Purniguda, Jeram Kala of Madhapar and Parbat Harbham of Jambudi towards Gunupur. Together, they completed 32 miles of new line. The Parlakmedi–Gunpur section was opened in two parts in 1929 & 1931.

In 1929, the contract for Parli to Parbhani section of 63 miles of Nizam's Guaranteed State Railway was also done by Mistris of Kutch, 40 miles contract was done by Nathoo Lalji Solanki of Madhapar, with Dahya Shamji Solanki of Madhapar and rest 23 miles was completed by other Mistri contractors from Lovaria & Chandiya.

In Junagadh State Railway in 1930 Veraval to Jamwala section was done by Govind Ladhha of Sinugra. This line was of 32 miles in length. The line was later extended from Jamwala to Devalda via Una for further 31 miles. This section was also done by Govind Ladhha of Sinugra with Hemraj Kanji Chawda of Sinugra.

In Calcutta, the contract for Bally Bridge of East Indian Railway was earned by Rai Bahadur Jagmal Raja Chauhan of Nagor. The construction started in 1926 was completed in 1932. The in-charge of Bally section of bridge was Laddha Punja of Nagor and on Dakshineswar side in-charge was Ladhha Ratna of Nagor. Brick-field in-charge was Kheta Ramji of Madhapar. Over-all supervisor was Mavji Punja of Nagor. It is a multi-span rail-cum-road bridge that connects Sealdah Station to Delhi and Grand Trunk Road at Howrah side to Barrackpore Trunk Road of Calcutta side. The fabrication of the bridge was done at works of Braithwate & Company, Calcutta. The Bridge was built with eight spans laid at distance of 300 ft each. The length of bridge is almost half mile with 10 km approach roads on both sides. The foundation laid with well-sinking 100 ft down the river beds, girding, erection of abutments, arching was all done by Jagmal Raja. This work also was over Rs. one crore. This Railway bridge is also important in annals of History of Railway in India because the Railway for the first time crossed over River Hooghly and reached Calcutta at Sealdah Terminus, which was commissioned in 1862. The other Howrah Terminus was at other side of Hooghly since 1854. The bridge was named Willingdon Bridge after then Viceroy of India, Lord Willingdon, who inaugurated it. The name plates mentioning Erection & Construction done by Raibhadur Jagmal Raja Chauhan, Allahbad can still be seen on each girder of the bridge. Also the name plates mentioning Fabrication of Bridge done by Braithwate & Co can be seen. The first train that ran across the bridge was named Jagmal Raja Howrah Express by British acknowledging the feat of Rai Bahadur Jagmal Raja Chauhan of Nagor. The bridge is now known as Vivekanand Setu. The railway line of 8.30 miles connecting Dankuni station of East Bengal Railway with Dum Dum station of East Indian Railway on Calcutta side of river and was also laid by Jagmal Raja. This railway was known initially as Calcutta Chord Railway before it was taken over by East Indian Railway.

In 1931, the Guntur to Macherla complete section of 83 miles of Madras and Southern Mahratta Railway was also done by trio of Jeram Jagmal of Kumbharia with Vishram Bhimjee of Khedoi & Morarjee Mandan of Khedoi. The tracks starting from Machrela  runs through Nadikudi, Piduguralla, Bellamkonda, Sattenapalle, Gudipudi, Peddakurapadu, Lingamguntla, Siripuram, Mandapadu, Bandarupalle to Guntur.

In South Indian Railway in 1932, Palghat to Pollachi section of 36 miles was completed by Ramji Lira of Kukma & Shivjee Lira of Kukma. The track traverses through Pudunagaram, Kollengode, Muthalamada, Minatchipuram.

In 1935, Rai Saheb Mulji Jagmal Sawaria and Ranchhod Jagmal of Kumbharia laid a private 8 miles long narrow-gauge rail line connecting their Bilaspur railway site with their brick-kiln across Arpa river at Lingiyadih. This line was dismantled in 1948 after independence of India.

A few notable Mistri contractors in Eastern Bengal Railway and Assam Bengal Railway were Hirji Vishram Parmar of Hajapar, who was stationed at Paksey and Nanji Mavji Chawda and Kumbha Mavji Chawda of Galpadar, stationed at Kushtia, Karsan Vishram Chauhan of Nagor, stationed at Saidpur and Mavji Kanji Rathod of Madhapar. They were also involved in construction of Hardinge Bridge, which was built over Padma from near Paksey to other side of river to Bheramara in 1910–12. All of them have together done works up to Shillong and Guwahati and between Sealdah to Dacca. Later in 1922 in East Indian Railway they did works in Ranchi to Daltonganj. Hirji Vishram Parmar later shifted to Uttarpara, even today there is Parmar Road named after his surname in Uttarpara, whereas Mavji Kanji's son Valji Mavji Rathod of Madhapar shifted to Bhopal. Valji Mavji Rathod of Madhapar was given Shirpav by Rulers of Bhopal State for his works in Bhopal State Railway. Karsan Vishram's son Jairam Karsan Chauhan of Nagor, shifted to Sambalpur from Saidpur at the time of partition of India, where he got a contract to build Hirakud Dam.

1940–1990
In 1941–42, Rai Sahib Visharm Valjee Rathod of Madhapar laid a 9 miles long private narrow-gauge light railway linking his Tawa Valley coal mines to Betul.

In 1944 in Bengal Nagpur Railway – Bankura to Midnapore doubling of 68 miles was done by Ladha Singh Bedi of Calcutta, Dhanraj Wasan of Bilaspur both Punjabi & Pragji Premji of Khedoi & Chakradharpur with Narshi Bechar of Anjar & Kharagpur, Ranchhod Nanji of Hajapar & Jamshedpur and Arajan Shivjee of Khedoi.

In 1946, Kharagpur to Kalikunda doubling and  Gokulpur to Hijli doubling of 10 miles of railway lines of both projects of Bengal Nagpur Railway were done by Pragji Premji Rathor & Arjan Shivjee Rathor of Khedoi, Narshi Bechar Khodiyar of Anjar and Ranchhod Nanji Tank of Hajapar.

In 1960–61, the 18 km doubling of –Jharsuguda–Dhutra section for South Eastern Railway including the bridge works over Ib river were done by Ranchhod Jagmal Sawaria of Kumbharia with other Mistri contractors.

Hirji Govindji Chawda of Chandiya did renovation and construction new section of Bialspur railway station complex in then under South Eastern Railway in 1986. As per Railway's order actually whole old building of main platform was to be demolished and reconstructed. But the original station, which in 1890 was built by their predecessor contractor of his community Jagmal Gangji Sawaria & Jeram Mandan  both of Kumbharia using hand-cut stones and lime-paste proved to be too strong. The labor had lot of difficulty in breaking the walls. At last, better sense prevailed over some Railway officer and only half of the Building of Railway station was re-built and other half was kept intact as heritage. This other half section has on its top engraved the year of its construction – 1890. Hirji Govindji Chawda of Chandia having his office at Bilaspur thus completed this building.

Some other works

Some other works of railways which, as per books mentioned hereunder, have been done by KGK Community are as follows:- in 1875 Muttra to Hathras MG line of MHSR, in 1881 Muttra to Achhnera MG line of MASR, in 1871 Luckeesarai to Sitarampur of EIR, in 1884 Hotgi to Bijapur in SMR, in 1884 Bijapur to Gadag via Bagalkot in SMR, in 1898 – 45 miles from Raipur – Dhamtari in RDR, in 1900 10.5 miles Abhanpur to Rajim section of RDR, in 1890 Raigarh to Sambalpur of BNR, in 1911 – 41 miles Ranchi to Lohardaga in EIR, in 1907 Baijnath to Bhagalpur of EIR, in 1905 Gomoh to Gaya of EIR, in 1894 Sini to Asansol of BNR, in 1890 Sini to Kharagpur of BNR, in 1895–99 Kharagpur to Balasore of BNR, Balasore to Barang in 1895–99 of BNR, Cuttack Road to Bhubaneswar in 1897 of BNR, in 1896 Khurda Road to Rambha of BNR, in 1895 Rambha to Behrampore of BNR, in 1911 – Kalimati to Aunlajori of BNR, in 1922 – Badampahar to Aunlajori of BNR, in 1910 Katol to Nagpur of GIPR, in 1891 Dhanbad to Sitarampur of EIR, in 1906 Dhanbad to Gomoh to Gaya of EIR, in 1895 – Jabalpur to Katni, in 1912 Yavatmal to Murtijapur NG line, 1914 Murtijapur – Achalpur NG line, in 1904 Sudamdih to Pathardih, in 1905 – Chhindwara to Barkhui, in 1906 Barsi – Kurudwadi – Pandharpur, in 1911 Barsi – Osmanabad – Latur,  in 1913 – Rohna to Kachidana NG line near Chhindwara, in 1915 – Tumsar to Tirodi NG line, in 1917 Howrah to Burdwan Chord-line, in 1919 – Panposh to Raipura, in 1886 Birsinghpur to Umaria of BNR,  in 1887 Miraj to Koregaon (76 mi), in 1891 Miraj to Kolhapur (30 mi),  in 1897 – Kacheguda to Nizamabad MG line of NGSR/HGVR, in 1897 – Nizamabad to Nander, in 1897 – Nander to Aurangabad, 1897 – Aurangabad to Manmad, in 1901 Katni to Marwara of BNR, in 1890 Koregaon to Poona, in 1910 – 32 miles Varsamedi to Bhachau of Cutch State Railway, in 1911 – 60 miles, in 1920 – Baripada to Bangriposi, in 1912 – 50  miles from Purna to Hingoli,  in 1927 Miraj – Pandharpur,  in 1929 – 63  miles from Parbhani to Parli of NGSR, in 1926 – 6.2 miles Barajamda to Barbil of BNR, in 1930 – 15 miles Anjar to Kandla of Cutch State Railway, in 1936 – 90 miles from Mavli to Marwar of RMR,  Assam Link Railway in 1948 from Kishanganj to Fakiragram of ER, in 1949 Pathankot to Mukerian railway link, in 1950 Deesa to Kandla MG link of WR, in 1954 Champa to Korba section of SER, in 1958 – Durg to Dalli Rajhara of SER, in 1960 – Bhilai to Ahiwara of SER, in 1963 – Sambalpur to Titlagarh section, in 1963 in Cuttack to Paradip section of SER, in 1965 Ranchi to Bondamunda, in 1965 Bailadila to Jagdalpur of DBK Project, Jagdalpur to Jeypore & Jeypore to Koraput section of DBK Project, to name a few.

Legacy
As per their community records there were more than 1000 persons, spanning over four to five generations, who worked as railway contractors over many decades from 1850 to 1980 with the list of railway contracts going into many thousands. Their contributions to building railway tracks in India continued for more than a century and a quarter. They were called "Kutchi Contractors" by railway authorities and people of the other states of India.

See also
Jagmal Raja Chauhan
Khora Ramji Chawda
Mulji Jagmal Sawaria
Jairam Valjee Chouhan
Ruda Ladha Chawra
Koovarji Karsan Rathor
Purushottam K. Chauhan

References

History of rail transport in India
Indian people in rail transport